Tullos is a town in LaSalle and Winn parishes in the U.S. state of Louisiana, along Castor Creek. The population was 385 at the 2010 census.

Geography
The northwest border of the town briefly crosses Castor Creek into Winn Parish.

U.S. Route 84 passes through the north side of the town, leading southeast  to Jena, the parish seat, and northwest  to Winnfield. U.S. Route 165, a four-lane divided highway, passes through the southeast corner of Tullos, leading northeast  to Grayson and south  to Alexandria.

Via Castor Creek, Tullos is part of the Little River watershed, flowing south and southeast to Catahoula Lake.

1953 tornado
On December 3, 1953, a violent F4 tornado hit the town, causing tremendous damage. Two small children were killed, and 15 others were injured.

Demographics

As of the census of 2000, there were 419 people, 168 households, and 113 families residing in the town. The racial makeup of the town was 95.70% White, 3.34% African American, and 0.95% from two or more races. Hispanic or Latino of any race were 0.48% of the population.

There were 168 households, out of which 31.5% had children under the age of 18 living with them, 57.1% were married couples living together, 6.0% had a female householder with no husband present, and 32.7% were non-families. 27.4% of all households were made up of individuals, and 14.3% had someone living alone who was 65 years of age or older. The average household size was 2.49 and the average family size was 3.06.

In the town, the population was spread out, with 25.1% under the age of 18, 7.2% from 18 to 24, 27.2% from 25 to 44, 25.3% from 45 to 64, and 15.3% who were 65 years of age or older. The median age was 37 years.  For every 100 females, there were 94.0 males. For every 100 females age 18 and over, there were 93.8 males.

The median income for a household in the town was $26,484, and the median income for a family was $31,786. Males had a median income of $24,896 versus $22,143 for females. The per capita income for the town was $14,265. About 13.8% of families and 18.3% of the population were below the poverty line, including 27.7% of those under age 18 and 12.0% of those age 65 or over.

Notable person
 Speedy O. Long, Louisiana state senator and U.S. congressman, born in Tullos and interred there at Magnolia Cemetery

References

Towns in Louisiana
Towns in LaSalle Parish, Louisiana
Towns in Winn Parish, Louisiana